The Russian Volleyball Super League 2008/2009 is the 18th official season of Russian Volleyball Super League. In all there are 12 teams.

Teams

Regular season

Classification 9–12 places

Play-off

Quarterfinals
Fakel vs Gazprom-Yugra 2–1

Iskra vs Lokomotiv Novosibirsk 2–0

Dynamo vs Ural 2–0

Zenit vs Lokomotiv Belogorie 2–1

Semifinals
Fakel vs Zenit 1–3

Iskra vs Dynamo 3–2

Classification 5–8 places
Lokomotiv Belogorie vs Gazprom-Yugra 3–0

Ural vs Lokomotiv Novosibirsk 1–3

Finals

Final 5–6 places
Lokomotiv Belogorie vs Lokomotiv Novosibirsk 3–1

Bronze medal matches
Fakel vs Dynamo 3–0

Gold medal matches
Iskra vs Zenit 0–3

Final standings

External links
 Volleyball in Russia season 08-09

Russian Volleyball Super League
2008 in volleyball
2009 in volleyball
2008 in Russian sport
2009 in Russian sport